Muck most often refers to:
Muck (soil), a soil made up primarily of humus from drained swampland

Muck may also refer to:

Places

Europe
 Muck, Scotland, an island
 Isle of Muck, County Antrim, a small island connected by sand spit to Portmuck, Northern Ireland

Elsewhere
 Muck Creek, a stream in the U.S. state of Washington
 Muck Glacier, Queen Maud Mountains, Antarctica

Arts, entertainment, and media

Games
 Muck (gambling), a number of actions, both legal and illegal
 Muck (poker), the discard pile or the action of discarding one's hand 
Muck (video game)
 Multi-User Chat Kingdom or TinyMUCK, a type of text-based multi-user game or chat forum

Other uses in arts, entertainment, and media
 Muck (film), a 2015 horror film
 Muck, a red bulldozer/dumper character in the children's television series Bob the Builder
"Muck", a song by Dinosaur Jr. from Green Mind, 1991

People with the name
 Desa Muck (born 1955), Slovene writer and actor
 Karl Muck (1859–1940), German conductor
 Muck Sticky (born 1977), American musician, songwriter, actor and artist

Other uses
 Muck (mining), sorting out the rich ore from the poor rock in an underground metallic mine after blasting
 Muck diving, diving into a normally muddy or "mucky" environment

See also
 Mucc, a Japanese rock band
 Mucker (disambiguation)
 Muckraker
 Muk (disambiguation)
 
 
Surnames of German origin
Surnames from nicknames